Penygroes is a village in Gwynedd, Wales. The village is located to the south of Caernarfon, and north of Porthmadog, by the A487 road. Penygroes' population stands at 1,793 at the 2011 census, of which 88% are Welsh-speaking, making it one of the most predominantly Welsh-speaking areas of the country. The population of Llanllyfni community, which includes Penygroes and Llanllyfni village, which practically adjoins Penygroes, plus Talysarn, is 4,135 according to the 2011 census.

Etymology 
The name of the village is derived from  "end" +  "[of] the" +  "cross[roads]", referring to the crossing at the village of the roads from Carmel, Rhyd-ddu and Pontllyfni with the main Caernarfon–Porthmadog road.

History and amenities
Penygroes is located in the former slate quarrying area of Dyffryn Nantlle, although most of the quarries are now closed down. However, it remains the valley's main shopping and administrative centre. Its biggest employer is a paper-converting plant producing hand tissues and toilet rolls.

It lies in the community of Llanllyfni, and nearby villages are Carmel, Talysarn, Nantlle, Tanrallt, Nebo, and Groeslon.

It is the site of the area's comprehensive school, Ysgol Dyffryn Nantlle (opera star Bryn Terfel's old school), and football team Nantlle Vale F.C., which used to be managed by the professional wrestler and promoter Orig Williams, better known by his ring name of "El Bandito". The club's former social complex has in recent years been demolished, and a new police station now occupies the site. As of a 2015 local council report 84% of the school's pupils come from primarily Welsh-speaking households.

The cycle path Lôn Eifion passes near the village, following the route of the former Carnarvonshire Railway, which ran from Caernarfon to Afon Wen and closed in 1964.

Penygroes lies by the edge of Lord Newborough's former estate at Glynllifon, from which several medieval legends have emanated. The character Lleu Llaw Gyffes, who features in the ages-old legends of the Mabinogi (sometimes inaccurately referred to as the Mabinogion), was said to have lived in the area. The Iron Age hillfort at Dinas Dinlleu and the village of Nantlle—originally spelt as Nantlleu—are said to have been named after him.

Notable people 
 Bryn Fôn (born 1954), Welsh actor and singer-songwriter
 Dafydd Glyn Jones (born 1941), Welsh scholar and lexicographer; went to school in Penygroes
 R. Williams Parry (1884–1956), notable 20th-century poet writing in Welsh
 Bill Pendergast (1915–2001), Welsh professional footballer with 118 club caps 
 Gareth Thomas (born 1954) politician and MP for Clwyd West, 1997 to 2005
 Betty Williams (born 1944), politician and former MP for Conwy from 1997 to 2010; went to school in Penygroes
 Owain Fôn Williams (born 1987), Welsh international goalkeeper with 443 club caps and artist

Notes

Villages in Gwynedd
Llanllyfni
Dyffryn Nantlle